Seth (The Cannon) Phillip Wand (born August 6, 1979) is a former American football offensive tackle. He was drafted by the Houston Texans in the third round of the 2003 NFL Draft. He played college football at Northwest Missouri State. Wand also played for the Tennessee Titans and Florida Tuskers. It is rumored that he inspired the look of Mr. Incredible in the popular Pixar movie. In 2021, he was inducted to the Mid-America Intercollegiate Athletics Association Hall of Fame for his outstanding career.

Early years
Wand attended Springfield Catholic High School in Springfield, Missouri and was a student and a letterman in football and basketball. He played offensive tackle and defensive end for the Springfield Catholic Fighting Irish. He played football for the Northwest Missouri State Bearcats. Seth was a left tackle for the Bearcats, allowing only one sack in his four years on the team.

Professional career

Houston Texans
Wand was drafted by the Houston Texans in the third round of the 2003 NFL Draft. He started his second season, but was waived three years later on September 2, 2006.

Tennessee Titans
Wand then had a stint with the Tennessee Titans during the 2006 season. He was waived during final cuts on September 1, 2007.

Oakland Raiders
On November 21, 2007, Wand signed with the Oakland Raiders. He was released by the team prior to the 2008 regular season opener on September 8, only to be re-signed two days later when offensive lineman Paul McQuistan was placed on injured reserve. On October 6, Wand was placed on injured reserve.

Wand was re-signed on August 5, 2009 after an injury to offensive tackle Khalif Barnes. He was released on September 5.

Florida Tuskers
Wand was drafted by the Florida Tuskers of the United Football League in the UFL Premiere Season Draft in 2009.

Second stint with Raiders
On August 2, 2011, Wand re-signed with the Oakland Raiders.
On September 4, 2011 Wand was cut by the Oakland Raiders.

References

External links
Just Sports Stats
United Football League bio

1979 births
Living people
Sportspeople from Springfield, Missouri
American football offensive tackles
Northwest Missouri State Bearcats football players
Houston Texans players
Tennessee Titans players
Oakland Raiders players
Florida Tuskers players